This is the results breakdown of the local elections held in Navarre on 26 May 1991. The following tables show detailed results in the autonomous community's most populous municipalities, sorted alphabetically.

Overall

City control
The following table lists party control in the most populous municipalities, including provincial capitals (shown in bold). Gains for a party are displayed with the cell's background shaded in that party's colour.

Municipalities

Barañain
Population: 16,184

Burlada
Population: 14,476

Estella
Population: 12,603

Pamplona
Population: 183,525

Tafalla
Population: 10,318

Tudela
Population: 27,063

See also
1991 Navarrese regional election

References

Navarre
1991